Nguyễn Đức Chung (born August 3, 1967) is a former Major General of the Vietnam People's Public Security and Vietnamese politician. He is a former Chairman of the Hanoi People's Committee. In August 2020, he was prosecuted and detained.

Đức Chung used to be Director of Hanoi City Police (2012-2016), a member of the 13th National Assembly of Vietnam (2011-2016), a member of the Hanoi delegation, member of the National Judiciary Committee session 13. In the Communist Party of Vietnam, he served as a member of the 12th Central Committee of the Vietnamese Communist Party, Deputy Secretary of the Hanoi Party Committee.

He was temporarily suspended from work for 90 days from August 11, 2020, to investigate, verify and clarify related responsibilities in a number of cases. On September 25, 2020, he was officially dismissed from all positions. Prior to that, his private driver and secretary had both been detained for investigation into the theft of State secrets. On November 22, 2020, the Investigation Agency of the Ministry of Public Security announced that Đức Chung played a master role in the theft of many secret documents about the Nhật Cường case (the case in which Đức Chung). On December 2, 2020, the Central Inspection Committee announced that it was considering the discipline of expulsion from the Party against Đức Chung.

Background 
Đức Chung was born on August 3, 1967, in Hanh Cù, Thanh Ba district, Phú Thọ province. Originally from Thăng Long commune, Kinh Môn town, Hải Dương province.

He has an older brother, Major General Nguyễn Tiến Thành, Deputy Chief Inspector of the Ministry of National Defense.

Sentenced to jail 
On the afternoon of December 11, the People's Court of Hanoi conducted a verdict on the case "Appropriating State secret documents" related to the case of Nhat Cuong Company, which belongs to the Central Steering Committee for Anti-corruption under the provisions of law monitor and direct. The court sentenced Đức Chung to 5 years in jail for the crime of "Appropriating state secret documents" according to the provisions of Article 337 - Penal Code 2015.

On the afternoon of December 13, 2021, on the crime of abusing positions and powers while on official duty, the Hanoi People's Court sentenced Đức Chung to 8 years in jail on charges of letting the family company buy Redoxy-3C products and sell them for the city.

On December 31, 2021, Đức Chung received an additional 3 years in jail for abusing his position and power while on official duty to create advantages for the Đông Kinh - Nhật Cường joint venture to win the bid.

On July 13 , 2022 Chung appeared court.Chung will spend a total of 10 years behind bars.

References 

1967 births
Living people
Hero of the People's Armed Forces
Vietnamese politicians
Members of the 12th Central Committee of the Communist Party of Vietnam